The 1878 Worcester by-election was fought on 28 March 1878.  The byelection was fought due to the death of the incumbent Liberal MP, Alexander Clunes Sheriff.  It was won by the Conservative candidate John Derby Allcroft.

References

1878 elections in the United Kingdom
1878 in England
19th century in Worcestershire
Politics of Worcester, England
By-elections to the Parliament of the United Kingdom in Worcestershire constituencies